Herreria is a genus of flowering plants native to South America. In the APG III classification system, the genus is placed in the family Asparagaceae, subfamily Agavoideae (formerly the family Agavaceae).

Herreria bonplandii Lecomte - Argentina, Paraguay, Uruguay
Herreria cipoana Ravenna - Minas Gerais
Herreria glaziovii Lecomte - Bolivia, Brazil
Herreria grandiflora Griseb. - Rio de Janeiro
Herreria latifolia Woodson - Minas Gerais, Bolivia
Herreria montevidensis Klotzsch ex Griseb. in C.F.P.von Martius  - Argentina, Paraguay, Uruguay, Bolivia
Herreria salsaparilha Mart. - Brazil
Herreria stellata Ruiz & Pav. - Chile

References

Asparagaceae genera
Agavoideae
Flora of South America